Neil Edward Tiedemann C.P. (born March 5, 1948) is an American prelate of the Roman Catholic Church serving as an auxiliary bishop for the Diocese of Brooklyn since 2016.  He previously served as bishop of the Diocese of Mandeville in Jamaica from 2008 to 2016.

Biography

Early life 
Neil Tiedemann was born on March 5, 1948, in Brooklyn, New York.  He professed to the Congregation of the Passion Order on August 22, 1971 and made his final vows to them on August 22, 1974.

On May 16, 1975, Tiedemann was ordained to the priesthood for the Passionists by Bishop Francis John Mugavero in Brooklyn.

Bishop of Mandeville 
On May 2, 2008, Pope Benedict XVI appointed Tiedemann as Bishop of the Diocese of  Mandeville.  He was consecrated by Archbishop Donald Reece at Saint Paul of the Cross Cathedral in Mandeville, Jamaica on August 6, 2008.

Auxiliary Bishop of Brooklyn 
Pope Francis appointed Tiedemann as an auxiliary bishop for the Diocese of Brooklyn on April 29, 2016; he was installed on August 4, 2016.

See also
 Catholic Church hierarchy
 Catholic Church in the United States
 Historical list of the Catholic bishops of the United States
 List of Catholic bishops of the United States
 Lists of patriarchs, archbishops, and bishops

References

External links
 Roman Catholic Diocese of Brooklyn Official Site

Episcopal succession

1948 births
Living people
People from Brooklyn
21st-century Roman Catholic bishops in the United States
Roman Catholic bishops of Mandeville
Passionist bishops